The 2020 Penn State Nittany Lions women's soccer team represented Pennsylvania State University during the 2020 NCAA Division I women's soccer season and the 2020 Big Ten Conference women's soccer season. As a result of the COVID-19 pandemic, the 2020 fall season was postponed to the spring, and began on February 19, 2021. It was the program's 27th season fielding a women's varsity soccer team, and their 27th season in the Big Ten Conference. The 2020 season is Erica Dambach's 14th year at the helm.

Background 
The 2020 season is the Nittany Lions' 27th season as a varsity soccer program, and their 27th season playing in the Big Ten Conference. The team is led by 14th year head coach, Erica Dambach, who had previously served as a head coach for the Harvard.

Player movement

Departures

Preseason

Preseason Big Ten poll 
Penn State was predicted to finish 1st in the Big Ten Conference.

Squad

Roster

Personnel 
{|class="wikitable"
|-
! style="" scope="col" colspan="2"|Front office
|-

|-
! style="" scope="col" colspan="2"|Coaching staff
|-

Schedule 

|-
!colspan=8 style=""| Regular season
|-

|-
!colspan=8 style=""| Big Ten Tournament
|-

|-
!colspan=8 style=""| NCAA Tournament
|-

Source:Penn State Athletics

Rankings

References

External links 

 PSU Soccer Schedule

Penn State Nittany Lions
Penn State Nittany Lions women's soccer